Lieutenant General Christian Tshiwewe Songesha (born 1968) is a military officer in the Armed Forces of the Democratic Republic of the Congo (FARDC). Effective 4 October 2022, he is the Chief of Staff of the Armed Forces of the Democratic Republic of the Congo, the title given to the commander of the armed forces of that country. Before his present position, he was the commander of the Republican Guard that is "responsible for the security of the Head of State and other strategic security installations". General Tshiwewe replaced Lieutenant General Célestin Mbala, who was the Chief of General Staff of the Armed Forces of the Democratic Republic of Congo from 14 July 2018 until 4 October 2022.

Biography
He was born in the city of Lubumbashi, in present-day Haut-Katanga Province, on 27 October 1968. In 1998, following the ouster of Mobutu Sese Seko by Laurent Kabila, Christian Tshiwewe was among the first infantry officers sent to train in Sudan. He followed that with a staff command course referred to as "Mura", in Likasi, in the Haut-Katanga Province. He received anti-terrorism training in Angola, by Israeli instructors. He attended the Brigade Commander Course at the higher military center in Kinshasa and also studied at the College of Advanced Military Studies and Defense Strategies in Kinshasa.

He served as commander of the 10th Mura Brigade, based in Kinshasa for the four years, starting in 2003. In 2007, he was appointed commander of the 13th Regiment of the Republican Guard, based in Lubumbashi, serving in that role for another four years. He then returned to Kinshasa and was promoted to Deputy Commander of the Republican Guard responsible for intelligence and operations. In 2020, he became the commander of the Republican Guard. President Félix Tshisekedi promoted him to the rank of Major General and then later to Lieutenant General.

See also
 Célestin Mbala
 Didier Etumba
 March 23 Movement

References

|-

1968 births
Living people
Democratic Republic of the Congo military personnel
21st-century Democratic Republic of the Congo people